Leonidas Cecil Bott (14 July 1889 – 21 August 1968) was an Australian cricketer and engineer who played 14 first-class matches for Western Australia between 1912 and 1925. Born in Adelaide, Bott was educated at Perth Boys' School and Christian Brothers' College, and later received a scholarship to study at the University of Adelaide. He played WACA grade cricket with North Fremantle, Perth, North Perth and Mount Lawley, and also played a number of games for Western Australia before and after the First World War, captaining the side in two matches in 1922 and 1924. Bott worked as an engineer, and was involved in the construction of the Kalgoorlie–Port Augusta railway in 1912. He later served as assistant-superintending engineer at the Victorian Postmaster-General's Department. In 1953, he was awarded the Coronation Medal of Queen Elizabeth II.

Bott was named in the Perth Cricket Club Team of the Century in 2012.

See also
 List of Western Australia cricket captains
 List of Western Australia first-class cricketers

References

1889 births
1968 deaths
Australian cricketers
20th-century Australian engineers
University of Adelaide alumni
Western Australia cricketers
People educated at Christian Brothers' College, Perth
Cricketers from Adelaide